"I Love a Piano" is a popular song with words and music by Irving Berlin.  It was copyrighted on December 9, 1920 and introduced in the Broadway musical revue Stop! Look! Listen! when it was performed by Harry Fox and the ensemble. The song was given a tremendous boost in the show as the set for it consisted of an enormous keyboard running completely across the stage. In front of this were six pianos with six pianists playing the tune. Irving Berlin always regarded the song as one of his best efforts.

Notable recordings
It was recorded for Victor Records (catalog No. 17945) by Billy Murray on January 5, 1916 and this enjoyed great success.

The top British recording was by Ethel Levey on the HMV label on 13 April 1916.

"I Love a Piano" was one of the songs featured in the film Easter Parade, as sung by Judy Garland.

Joe Bushkin for his album I Love a Piano (1950).

Benny Fields & Blossom Seeley - included in the album Two-a-Day at the Palace (1957) 

Burl Ives - included in his album Burl Ives Sings Irving Berlin  (1960).

Andre Previn - for his album Like Love (1960).

Liberace - for his album The Love Album (1967).

Andy Williams and Kermit the Frog - on The Muppet Show, Episode 4x22, as part of their duet medley (1980)

Barbara Cook - for her album It's Better with a Band (1981).

Michael Feinstein - from his album Live at the Algonquin  (1986).

Tony Bennett - for MTV Unplugged (1994)

Betty Johnson - included in the compilation album Love Walked In (1999).

Gerard Kenny - Gerard Kenny in Concert (2007).

References

Songs written by Irving Berlin
Songs from musicals
1915 songs